Andy Dugan (born December 16, 1981) is an American actor and filmmaker. He has worked on a variety of branded content as well, writing, directing and producing short films, commercials, music videos, web serials and marketing campaigns.

Biography

Early life and education
Andy Dugan was born in Oklahoma City, Oklahoma on December 16, 1981. He moved to New York City in 2001 and studied at the New York Film Academy, then moved to Los Angeles in 2003 to start his filmmaking career.

Career
Dugan has overseen numerous successful social media marketing campaigns and has cultivated relationships with such brands as Rogue Pictures, Fox, Sony Pictures, FedEx, Heineken, Universal Studios, Fanista and more. He produced and directed online spots featuring such talent as Jackson Browne, Sylvester Stallone and Mana for the "BURMA, It Can't Wait" campaign, as well as produced the groundbreaking HIV prevention campaign entitled "In The Moment".

As a screenwriter, he has written feature films, TV shows, web serials, commercials and shorts.  He has directed a feature film, numerous commercials and music videos, and TV shows.

Andy lives in Los Angeles and is represented by United Talent Agency.

Filmography
 Producer: Leonard Knight: A Man & His Mountain 2015

Awards and honors
2007: Emmy Award, Outstanding Broadband Drama, Satacracy 88
2007: Webby Award, Best Dramatic Online Film and Video

References

External links

1981 births
Living people
American film directors
Film producers from California
American music video directors
American television directors
Television producers from California
Male actors from Oklahoma City
New York Film Academy alumni
Male actors from Los Angeles
Film producers from Oklahoma